Macroglossum mitchellii, the grey-striped hummingbird hawkmoth, is a moth of the family Sphingidae described by Jean Baptiste Boisduval in 1875. It is known from Sri Lanka, southern and eastern India, Thailand, southern China, Taiwan, Vietnam, Malaysia (Peninsular, Sarawak) and Indonesia (Sumatra, Kalimantan, Java).

Description
The wingspan is 55–74 mm. This species is easily recognised by the upperside of the head and thorax having a broad, very dark median stripe that divides the pinkish-grey background into two stripes. Forewings with antemedial band much broader at inner margin. Postmedial band is black in colour angled at vein 6, where it joined to subapical markings. Hindwings with yellow band broader and hardly constricted at middle. Ventral side has lines on hindwing rather more prominent.

Subspecies
Macroglossum mitchellii mitchellii (Java)
Macroglossum mitchellii imperator Butler, 1875

References

Macroglossum
Moths described in 1875
Moths of Asia
Moths of Sri Lanka